James A. Clark was an American football running back who played two seasons in the National Football League with the Pittsburgh Pirates. He played college football at the University of Pittsburgh and attended The Kiski School in Saltsburg, Pennsylvania.

References

External links
Just Sports Stats

1909 births
Year of death missing
American football running backs
Pittsburgh Panthers football players
Pittsburgh Pirates (football) players
The Kiski School alumni